His Grace Gives Notice is a 1922 comedy novel by Lady Laura Troubridge. A butler tries to hide the fact that he has recently inherited a title and an estate so that he can continue to romance the daughter of the house where he is in service.

Adaptations
The novel was adapted into films twice. In 1924 a silent version His Grace Gives Notice was directed by W.P. Kellino. In 1933 a sound adaptation His Grace Gives Notice directed by George A. Cooper was released.

References

Bibliography
 Shafer, Stephen C. British popular films, 1929-1939: The Cinema of Reassurance. Routledge, 1997.

1922 British novels
British novels adapted into films
Novels set in England